This is a list of notable bands considered to be thrashcore. Thrashcore (also known as fastcore) is a fast tempo subgenre of hardcore punk that emerged in the early 1980s, that is essentially sped-up hardcore, often using blast beats.

 ACxDC
 The Accüsed
 Benümb
 Code 13
 Cryptic Slaughter
 Deep Wound
 Dirty Rotten Imbeciles
 Dr and The Crippens
 Dropdead
 Electro Hippies
 Fig 4.0
 Flag of Democracy
 Heresy
 Gauze
 Guyana Punch Line
 Hellnation
 Hüsker Dü
 King Parrot
 Lärm
 Los Crudos
 Raw Power
 Septic Death
 Septic Tank
 Siege
 S.O.B.
 Straight Ahead
 Svetlanas
 Trash Talk 
 Vitamin X
 Vivisick
 Void
 What Happens Next?

References

Lists of hardcore punk bands